Sir Vincent Gerard O'Sullivan  (born 28 September 1937) is one of New Zealand's best-known writers. He is a poet, short story writer, novelist, playwright, critic, editor, biographer, and librettist.

Early life and family
Born in Auckland, O'Sullivan is the youngest of six children born to Timothy O'Sullivan (born in Tralee, Ireland) and Myra O'Sullivan (née McKean). He was educated at St Joseph's Primary, Grey Lynn, and Sacred Heart College, Auckland, in Glendowie. He graduated from the University of Auckland and the University of Oxford.

O'Sullivan's first marriage was to Tui Rererangi Walsh, with whom he had two children; Dominic O'Sullivan and Deirdre O'Sullivan. He now lives in Port Chalmers, Dunedin, with his wife Helen.

Career
O'Sullivan lectured at Victoria University of Wellington (VUW) from 1963 to 1966, and the University of Waikato between 1968 and 1978). He served as literary editor of the NZ Listener from 1979 to 1980, and then between 1981 and 1987 won a series of writer’s residencies and research fellowships in universities in Australia and New Zealand: VUW, University of Tasmania, Deakin University (Geelong), Flinders University in Adelaide, University of Western Australia, and University of Queensland. These were interrupted in 1983 by a year as resident playwright at Downstage Theatre, Wellington. In 1988 he returned to VUW, where he was professor of English literature until his retirement in 2004.

Honours and awards
In 1966, O'Sullivan won the NZSA Jessie Mackay Award for Best First Book of Poetry, in 1979 he received the Katherine Mansfield Memorial Award for a short story, and in 1994 he received the Katherine Mansfield Memorial Fellowship. He won the Montana New Zealand Book Award for Poetry in 1999.

In the 2000 Queen's Birthday Honours, O’Sullivan was appointed a Distinguished Companion of the New Zealand Order of Merit, for services to literature. In 2009, following the restoration of titular honours by the New Zealand government, he initially declined redesignation as a Knight Companion of the New Zealand Order of Merit, because, in his view, it did not fit New Zealand "historically and socially", and that "it didn't seem to make much sense in contemporary New Zealand society". However, he accepted the change in December 2021.

O'Sullivan was awarded the Creative New Zealand Michael King Writer's Fellowship in 2004, the 2005 Montana New Zealand Book Award for Poetry, and the Prime Minister’s Award for Literary Achievement in 2006. He was the New Zealand Poet Laureate for the term 2013 to 2015, and in 2016 he was the Honoured New Zealand Writer at the Auckland Writers Festival.

The Dark is Light Enough: Ralph Hotere a Biographical Portrait won for him the 2021 General non-fiction award at the Ockham New Zealand Book Awards.

Works

Poetry

1965 Our Burning Time
1969 Revenants
1973 Bearings
1976 From the Indian Funeral
1977 Butcher & Co.
1980 Brother Jonathan, Brother Kafka (with prints by John Drawbridge)
1982 The Rose Ballroom and Other Poems
1982 The Butcher Papers
1986 The Pilate Tapes
1992 Selected Poems
1988 Seeing You Asked
2001 Lucky Table
2004 Nice Morning for It, Adam
2004 Homecoming - Te Hokinga Mai                                                                                                                                             
2007 Blame Vermeer2009 Further Convictions Pending: Poems 1998–20082011 The Movie May Be Slightly Different2013 Us, Then2015 Being Here: Selected Poems 
2016 And So It Is: New PoemsShort stories
1978 The Boy, The Bridge, The River1981 Dandy Edison for Lunch and Other Stories1985 Survivals1990 The Snow in Spain: Short Stories1992 Palms and Minarets: Selected Stories2014 The Families: StoriesNovels
1976 Miracle: A Romance1993 Let the River Stand2018 All This By ChancePlays
1983 Shuriken (Downstage, Wellington)
1983 Lysistrata (not performed)
1984 Ordinary Nights in Ward 10 (New Depot, Wellington) 
1988 Jones and Jones (Downstage, Wellington)
1989 Billy (Bats Theatre, Wellington)
1994 The Lives and Loves of Harry and George (Downstage, Wellington)
1996 Take the Moon, Mr Casement (Court Theatre, Christchurch)
2003 Yellow Brides2021 Simple Acts of Malice

Nonfiction

1974 Katherine Mansfield's New Zealand (revised 2013)
1976 James K. Baxter (New Zealand Writers and Their Work series)
2002 On Longing (Montana Essay Series)
2003 Long Journey to the Border: A Life of John Mulgan2020 Ralph Hotere: The Dark is Light EnoughEdited works

 1970 An Anthology of Twentieth-Century New Zealand Poetry (revised 1976 and 1987)
1975 New Zealand Short Stories: Third Series1983 The Oxford Anthology of New Zealand Writing Since 1945, co-editor with MacDonald P. Jackson
1982 The Aloe, with Prelude1985 Collected Poems: Ursula Bethell1988 Poems of Katherine Mansfield1989 The Selected Letters of Katherine Mansfield1992 The Oxford Book of New Zealand Short Stories1993 Intersecting Lines: The Memoirs of Ian Milner1997 New Zealand Stories: Katherine Mansfield1984, 1987, 1993, 1996, 2003 The Collected Letters of Katherine Mansfield (vols. 1–5), co-editor with Margaret Scott
2006, 2012 The Collected Fiction of Katherine Mansfield, 1916–1922 (vols. 1–2), co-editor with Gerri Kimber

 Librettos 

 2002 Black Ice (with composer Ross Harris)
 2004 Lines from the Beach House (with composer David Farquhar)
 2008 The Floating Bride, the Crimson Village (with composer Ross Harris)
 2010 The Abiding Tides (with composer Ross Harris)
 2012 Songs for Beatrice: Making Light of Time (with composer Ross Harris)
 2014 Notes from the Front: Songs on Alexander Aitken (with composer Ross Harris)
 2014 Requiem for the Fallen (with composer Ross Harris)
 2014 If Blood Be the Price (with composer Ross Harris)
 2016 Brass Poppies (with composer Ross Harris)
 2018 Face (with composer Ross Harris)

 Festschrift 

 2007 Still shines when you think of it : a festschrift for Vincent O'Sullivan, edited by Bill Manhire and Peter Whiteford

Further reading

'10 Questions: Vincent O'Sullivan', New Zealand String Quartet, 20 February 2014
'Vincent O'Sullivan: NZ poet, author, biographer', Radio New Zealand, 28 February 2014
'Ross Harris and Vincent O'Sullivan', Radio New Zealand, 1 March 2016
'Let us now contemplate what to do with Katherine Mansfield's bones: A proposal by Vincent O'Sullivan', The Spinoff, 28 March 2017
'Vincent O'Sullivan's first novel in 20 years a "landmark book" for NZ literature', by Mike White, North & South, 5 November 2018
'The deep discomfort of remembering, Ann Beaglehole', New Zealand Review of Books / Pukapuka Aotearoa, 6 June 2018All This By Chance reviewed by Nicholas Reid on Stuff, 11 March 2018
 'Book of the Week: The best New Zealand novel of 2018': All This By Chance reviewed by Elizabeth Alley, The Spinoff, 22 March 2018
 All This By Chance reviewed by Marcus Hobson on NZ Booklovers
 All This By Chance reviewed by Lesley McIntosh on The Reader, NZ Booksellers blog, 19 April 2018
'Acclaimed writers Vincent O’Sullivan and Diana Wichtel explore their very different approaches to representing the Holocaust', Radio New Zealand, 26 December 2018
'The Confession Box: Vincent O'Sullivan', The New Zealand Herald'', 11 May 2019

See also 

New Zealand literature
Best New Zealand Poems

References

External links
New Zealand Book Council profile
Academy of New Zealand Literature profile
Victoria University Press author page
Penguin Books NZ author page
Steele Roberts author page
Bridget Williams Books (BWB) author page
The New Zealand Poet Laureate Blog
Wellington Writers Walk

1937 births
Living people
New Zealand poets
New Zealand Poets Laureate
New Zealand male poets
University of Auckland alumni
Alumni of the University of Oxford
Academic staff of the Victoria University of Wellington
New Zealand people of Irish descent
20th-century New Zealand novelists
New Zealand male novelists
20th-century New Zealand male writers
Writers from Auckland
Knights Companion of the New Zealand Order of Merit
People from Port Chalmers